Hillside Ruin is a large McElmo style great house and archeological site located near Pueblo Bonito in Chaco Culture National Historical Park, New Mexico. The mostly unexcavated building was occupied during the mid-12th century.

References

Bibliography

Colorado Plateau
Ancestral Puebloans
Post-Archaic period in North America
Archaeological sites in New Mexico
Chaco Canyon
Chaco Culture National Historical Park